Krokek is a locality situated in Norrköping Municipality, Östergötland County, Sweden with 4,285 inhabitants in 2010. It is the main settlement of Kolmården and located a few kilometres away from the Sörmland border.

Riksdag elections

References 

Coastal cities and towns in Sweden
Populated places in Östergötland County
Populated places in Norrköping Municipality